Daniel O'Connor (born March 29, 1952) is an American racewalker. He competed in the men's 20 kilometres walk at the 1984 Summer Olympics.

References

1952 births
Living people
Athletes (track and field) at the 1984 Summer Olympics
American male racewalkers
Olympic track and field athletes of the United States
Place of birth missing (living people)